Mutoko Airport  is an airport serving Mutoko, a city in Mashonaland East Province, Zimbabwe.

See also
Transport in Zimbabwe
List of airports in Zimbabwe

References

External links
Mutoko Airport
OurAirports - Mutoko
OpenStreetMap - Mutoko

Airports in Zimbabwe
Mutoko District
Buildings and structures in Mashonaland East Province